Longueuil—Charles-LeMoyne is a federal electoral district in Quebec, Canada, that has been represented in the House of Commons of Canada since 2015. It encompasses a portion of Quebec formerly included in the electoral districts of Saint-Bruno—Saint-Hubert and Saint-Lambert.

Longueuil—Charles-LeMoyne was created by the 2012 federal electoral boundaries redistribution and was legally defined in the 2013 representation order. It came into effect upon the call of the 42nd Canadian federal election, scheduled for 19 October 2015.

The riding was originally intended to be named LeMoyne.

Profile
Despite breaking for the NDP in 2011, Longueuil—Charles-Lemoyne has become more of a competition between the Liberals and the Bloc Québécois, with the Liberals performing better in more Anglophone areas, such as Greenfield Park.

Demographics
According to the Canada 2016 Census
 Twenty most common mother tongue languages (2016) :  73.8% French, 8.9% English, 3.7% Spanish, 2.5% Arabic, 1.4% Creole languages, 1.1% Persian, 1.0% Romanian, 0.8% Mandarin, 0.7% Portuguese, 0.6% Russian, 0.5% Cantonese, 0.5% Italian, 0.4% Vietnamese, 0.3% Greek, 0.2% Kabyle, 0.2% Bulgarian, 0.2% Lao, 0.2% Polish, 0.2% Wolof, 0.2% Tagalog

Members of Parliament

This riding has elected the following Members of Parliament:

Election results

References

Quebec federal electoral districts
Politics of Longueuil